Alan Williams (born 1954 in Manchester, England) is a British actor and playwright, who has performed in film, television and theatre in both the United Kingdom and Canada.

Life and career
Originally from Manchester and educated at The Manchester Grammar School, he took some classes in theatre school but received the bulk of his training as an apprentice with the Hull Truck Theatre. He performed his Cockroach trilogy of one-man plays (The Cockroach That Ate Cincinnati, The Return of the Cockroach and The Cockroach Has Landed) at the influential London fringe venue The Bush Theatre and subsequently at the International Theatre Festival in Toronto, Ontario in 1981, and then decided to remain in the city, becoming playwright in residence at the Tarragon Theatre.

He later moved to Winnipeg, Manitoba, becoming a theatre professor at the University of Winnipeg. His subsequent plays in Canada included The Warlord of Willowdale, The White Dogs of Texas, King of America, Dixieland's Night of Shame, Welcome to the NHL and The Duke of Nothing. He also took some acting roles in other playwrights' work, most notably appearing opposite Linda Griffiths in her two-person play The Darling Family and its 1994 film adaptation by Alan Zweig.

In 1996, his Cockroach trilogy was adapted into the film The Cockroach that Ate Cincinnati. The film garnered Williams a Genie Award nomination for Best Actor at the 18th Genie Awards. Soon after completing the film of The Cockroach that Ate Cincinnati, Williams moved back to England, where he has had roles in films such as The Scold's Bridle, Touching Evil, The Life and Death of Peter Sellers and Vera Drake, and television series including Always and Everyone, Coronation Street, Wire in the Blood, Life Begins, The Virgin Queen, Rome, Luther, Father Brown, Doc Martin and Starlings. He returned to Canada in 2015 to tour his new theatre trilogy The Girl with Two Voices.

Filmography

 Mistress Madeleine (1976) as Kirk
 The Darling Family (1994) as He
 The Cockroach that Ate Cincinnati (1996) as Captain
 Getting Hurt (TV - 1998) as Paranoid
 Among Giants (1998) as Frank
 Elephant Juice (1999) as Gezzer-man on Tube
 Love in a Cold Climate (2001) as Religious speaker
 All or Nothing (2002) as Drunk
 Heartlands (2002) as Deno
 Sirens (TV - 2002) as DCI Struther
 Bright Young Things (2003) as Bookie
 The Mayor of Casterbridge (TV - 2003) as Stubberd
 The Last King (2003 TV mini-series) as Preacher
 The Life and Death of Peter Sellers (2004) as 'Casino Royale' Director
 Vera Drake (2004) as Sick husband
 Derailed (2005) as Ken Hodson
 A Waste of Shame (2005) as George Wilkins
 The Virgin Queen (2005 TV mini-series) as Doctor John Dee
 Grow Your Own (2007) as Kenny
 Personal Affairs (2009) as David Johnston
 Pulse (TV - 2010) as Charlie Maddox
 London Boulevard (2010) as Joe
 The Crimson Petal and the White (2011) as Colonel Leek
 Midsomer Murders The Sleeper Under the Hill (2011) as Ezra Canning
 Run for Your Wife (2012) 
 Endeavour (series 1 episode 4 - 2013) as Cyril Morse
 The Crown (2016) as Professor Hogg
 Trespass Against Us (2017) as Noah
 Father Brown (2017-2020)5 episodes as Blind ‘Arry
 Peterloo (2018) as Magistrate Marriott
 The Capture (TV series) (2019) as Eddie Emery
 Chernobyl (2019) as KGB Deputy Chairman Viktor Charkov
 Casualty (2021) as Roy Scaddon
 Inside Man (2022) as Gordon

References

External links
 

20th-century British male actors
20th-century British dramatists and playwrights
20th-century Canadian male actors
20th-century Canadian dramatists and playwrights
21st-century British male actors
21st-century British dramatists and playwrights
British male television actors
British male film actors
British male stage actors
British male dramatists and playwrights
British emigrants to Canada
Canadian male television actors
Canadian male film actors
Canadian male stage actors
Canadian male dramatists and playwrights
Canadian expatriates in England
Male actors from Manchester
Writers from Manchester
Academic staff of University of Winnipeg
20th-century Canadian male writers
21st-century Canadian male writers
Living people
1954 births